Volga, GRAU index 14S46, also designated 141KS, is a rocket upper stage designed in Russia.  It is used with the Soyuz-2.1a and Soyuz-2-1v rockets to insert payloads into sun-synchronous orbit.  It is derived from the propulsion module of the Yantar spy satellites.  It is closely related to the retired Ikar upper stage.

References 

Expendable space launch systems
Rocket stages
Space launch vehicles of Russia